Cool pavement is a road surface that uses additives to reflect solar radiation unlike conventional dark pavement. Conventional dark pavements contribute to urban heat islands as they absorb 80–95% of sunlight and warm the local air. Cool pavements are made with different materials to increase albedo, thereby reflecting shortwave radiation out of the atmosphere. Increasing albedo reduces heat transfer to the surface and can hypothetically cause local cooling if the spatial scale of the albedo reduction is sufficiently large. The EPA reports "that if pavement reflectance throughout a city were increased from 10 to 35 percent, the air temperature could potentially be reduced by 1°F (0.6°C)." Existing dark pavement can be altered to increase albedo through whitetopping or by adding reflective coats and seals. New pavement can be constructed to increase albedo by using modified mixes, permeable pavements, and vegetated pavements.

Benefits
 Reduction in energy usage. Energy usage is reduced as local temperatures are cooled. Lower temperatures allow air conditioners to cool buildings with less energy. Temperature reductions attributed to increased pavement albedo in Los Angeles resulted in over $90 million per year in savings. Reflective pavement also reduces energy at night as they demand lower street light usage.
 Improvement in air quality. A reduction in energy usage would lower greenhouse emissions and air pollution (dependent on electric power fuel mix). Lower temperatures would also slow chemical reactions that create smog. In 2007, Surabi Menon and Hashem Akbari estimated that an increase of global pavement albedo of 35 to 39 percent could reduce carbon dioxide emissions worth about $400 billion.

Drawbacks 
 Brightness. Cool pavement reflects much more light into the eyes of drivers, thus having the potential to temporarily blind them.
 Considerable variation in unit price. Cool pavement costs vary as a result of numerous factors:
 Geographical region
 Local climate
 Labor contractors
 Time of year
 Site accessibility
 Underlying soils
 Project size
 Expected traffic
 The desired life of the pavement

See also 

 Whitetopping
 Permeable pavement
 Solar mirror

References

Pavements